Claudia Leenders (born 18 November 1994 in Helmond) is a Dutch slalom canoeist who has competed at the international level since 2009.

She became a member of HWC Helmet sailors, the canoe club in Helmond, at the age of 8 because her older brother Stijn and her father had been active in the sport of canoeing. Leenders and her brother were selected for the Talent Development Team when Claudia was eleven years old. In 2009 she qualified for the Junior European Championships and the Junior World Cup. She made her first appearances at the senior level in 2010, with participations at the European Championships, World Championships and the World Cup.

References

 http://happysailor.nl/1391554801/help_claudia_naar_de_olympische_spelen/
 https://web.archive.org/web/20140222011620/http://www.claudialeenders.nl/biografie/

External links

 Official website

1994 births
Sportspeople from Helmond
Living people
Dutch female canoeists
21st-century Dutch women